Bob Lock (born 1949) is a Welsh science fiction and fantasy writer.

Biography
Bob Lock was born in 1949, in Gower near Swansea.

His work first appeared on Youwriteon.

Bibliography
 The Leaf in the Stone, published in Cold Cuts 1 (An anthology of horror stories) 
 Nearly Home, published in Cold Cuts 2 (An anthology of horror stories 
 Featured in Tapestries of the heart (An anthology of poems) 
 Flames of Herakleitos
 Madness
 The Empathy Effect
 They Feed on Flesh

External links
 Bob Lock's website

20th-century British novelists
21st-century British novelists
British science fiction writers
Welsh science fiction writers
People from Swansea
Living people
1949 births
British male novelists
20th-century British male writers
21st-century British male writers